The Will or Determination (translit. Al-Azeema) is a 1939 Egyptian film, directed by Kamal Selim. It is considered one of the greatest Egyptian movies of all time, and has been voted the best Egyptian film of all time in the list of Top 100 Egyptian films in 20th century, among other websites and magazines.

Plot
A young couple, Muhammad and Fatima, fall in love and get married. However, their bliss is cut short when Muhammad loses his job and is forced to work as fabric salesman, without telling his wife. Some of the neighbors then scheme to get Fatima to see her husband working as a fabric salesman. Things turn around when his reason for dismissal from his old job disappears and he is rehired, and all seems well for the young couple. The film paints a vivid picture of the economic crisis that ravaged Egypt in the 1930s.

Cast
 Hussein Sedki as Mohamed Hanafi
 Fatma Rouchdi as Fatma
 Anwar Wagdy as Adly Nazih
 Abdel Aziz Khalil as El Etre

Production

Director Kamal Selim took great care on the production design aspect of filming, in order to make it seem as if he had filmed live at the slums of Egypt. As a result, it is considered the first film to accurately and realistically display the slums of Egypt.

Themes
The Will was one of the first films to accurately portray the slums of Egypt. It has been praised for its realistic depiction of life in the slums, and the struggles men and women go through within these slums. Released in 1939, The Will has carried on an enduring legacy, due in part to its sympathetic view on the lives of the average Egyptian people, who did not enjoy much luxuries at the time, and who often faced struggles with love and employment similar to the ones faced by the protagonist in the film, making the film a social commentary on its era.

Critical reception
The Will is considered by many to be the greatest Egyptian film ever made, and is well respected, not only in Egypt, but in the international cinematic community as well. It was voted the #1 Egyptian film by egypty.com, and is often cited as one of the greatest films ever made.

Legacy
The Will is considered one of the first examples, or one of the precursors, of the Italian Neorealism movement in film, which would later expand to include films such as The Bicycle Thief and Pather Panchali.

References

External links 
 

1939 films
1930s Arabic-language films
Films set in Egypt
Egyptian black-and-white films
Egyptian musical comedy films
1939 musical comedy films